William Richard Edgcumbe, Viscount Valletort (19 November 1794 – 29 October 1818), was a British politician.

Background
Valletort was the eldest son of Richard Edgcumbe, 2nd Earl of Mount Edgcumbe, and Lady Sophia, daughter of John Hobart, 2nd Earl of Buckinghamshire.

Political career
Valletort was elected Member of Parliament for Lostwithiel in 1816, a seat he held until 1818. He unsuccessfully contested Fowey in June 1818. However, in March 1819, four months after his death, he was successfully returned on petition.

Personal life
Lord Valletort died unmarried in October 1818, aged 23, predeceasing his father. His younger brother Ernest later succeeded in the earldom.

References

1794 births
1818 deaths
Members of the Parliament of the United Kingdom for constituencies in Cornwall
UK MPs 1812–1818
Heirs apparent who never acceded
British courtesy viscounts